Ahmed Şefik Midhat Pasha (18 October 1822 – 26 April 1883) was an Ottoman democrat, kingmaker and one of the leading statesmen during the late Tanzimat period. He is most famous for leading the Ottoman constitutional movement of 1876 and introducing the First Constitutional Era, but was also a leading figure of reform in the educational and provincial administrations. He was part of a governing elite which recognized the crisis the Empire was in and considered reform to be a dire need. Midhat Pasha is described as a person with a liberal attitude and is often considered one of the founders of the Ottoman Parliament.

He was described by historian Caroline Finkel as "a true representative of Tanzimat optimism, who believed that separatist tendencies could be best countered by demonstrating the benefits of good government." 
The Midhat Pasha Souq in Damascus still bears his name.

Early life
Midhat Pasha was born in Istanbul in the Islamic month of Safar, 1238 AH (which began on 18 October 1822), into a well-established family of Muslim scholars. Born into an Ilmiye family, he received a private and medrese education. His father was Hadjdji 'Air Efendi-Zade Hadjdji Hafiz Mehemmed Eshref Efendi, a native of Ruse. The family seem to have been professed Bektashis.

He spent his youth in his parents' home in Vidin, Lovech and later Istanbul, where his father held judicial office. In 1836 he worked in the secretariat of the grand vizier, and in 1854 the Grand Vizier Kıbrıslı Mehmed Emin Pasha gave him the task of pacifying the province of Adrianople, and he succeeded in putting down banditry in the Balkans in 1854–1856. In 1858 he spent six months traveling in western Europe for studies, including in Vienna, Paris, Brussels and London.

Governor of Niš, Danube and Baghdad

In 1861 he was appointed governor of Niš, where he was instrumental in introducing the vilayet system in the Balkans. He was governor of the Danube Province from 1864 to 1868. During his governorship, he built countless schools and educational institutes, built hospitals, granaries, roads and bridges, paying for these projects through voluntary contributions from the people. He clashed with the Grand Vizier Ali Pasha, which led to his appointment as governor of Baghdad in 1869, as the appointment to such a remote posting was intended as a punishment.

After his arrival in Baghdad in 1869, he opened a series of government schools, as the city previously had no state educational institutions. He also emphasized reforming the Sixth Army, and to that end he opened military schools. The military schools were to have the more lasting impact: by 1900, the civil preparatory high school was attended by only 96 students, compared to 256 for the military preparatory school, and 846 for the military middle school in the same year.

He helped modernize the province, and he re-established Ottoman rule in al-Hasa. He enacted the vilayet system in Baghdad, and applied the 1858 land decree under which miri land could be granted to individuals, under a system known as nizam tapu. Sir Henry Dobbs recognised the three years of Midhat Pasha's governorship as the most stable and secure period of Ottoman rule in the region. He left the post in 1872, returning to Istanbul.

Appointment as Grand Vizier

He was appointed Grand Vizier by Abdülaziz in 1872, but his first tenure came to an abrupt end, mainly due to his clashes with Abdülaziz over financial and economic issues. He was dismissed after two months. He also served as Minister of Justice in 1873 and 1875, but his tenure in these offices was short-lived, owing to his inclination towards a constitutional regime.

The emerging internal, financial and diplomatic crises of 1875–1876 provided him with a chance to introduce the constitution of 1876.

On 15 June 1876, an Ottoman infantry officer named Çerkes Hasan assaulted a meeting in the mansion of Midhat Pasha, where all the chief ministers were present. The Minister of War Huseyin Avni Pasha was shot, and the Foreign Minister Rashid Pasha was killed, as was one of Midhat's servants, named Ahmed Aga. In total, 5 were killed and 10 were wounded, and Hasan was sentenced to death for the crime, in an incident known as the Çerkes Hasan Olayı.

Midhat Pasha was again appointed Grand Vizier, in place of Mehmed Rushdi Pasha, on 19 December 1876. When he was appointed, he promised to continue on the path of reform, and announced on 23 December 1876 that a constitution would be promulgated and a representative parliament established. Though not a member of the commission that drafted the constitution, he played an important part in its adoption. The constitution provided for equal rights for all citizens without distinction of race or creed, abolition of slavery, an independent judiciary based on civil (rather than religious) law, universal elementary education, and a bicameral parliament, with a Senate appointed by the Sultan and a directly elected Chamber of Deputies.

Popular support for the constitution began to plummet when it became known that it was to grant equal rights for non-Muslims. The softas, which had been Midhat's supporters just months earlier, became largely opposed. Midhat Pasha managed to pressure Abdul Hamid II into approving the constitution, but the Sultan was able to include the notorious article 113, which gave him the power to banish anyone from the empire without trial or other legal procedure.

Abdul Hamid had no real interest in constitutionalism, and on 5 February 1877, he exiled Midhat Pasha. Sent to Brindisi on the imperial yacht, from there he visited France, Spain, Austria-Hungary and the United Kingdom, where he wrote memoranda supporting the Ottoman cause in the Russo-Turkish War of 1877–78, and a pamphlet defending Ottoman reforms. Midhat's popularity in Europe, coupled with British pressure, led Abdul Hamid to allow him to return from exile, and he arrived in Crete on 26 September 1878.

After the war ended, Sultan Abdul Hamid II dismissed the government and returned to despotic rule.

Governor of Syria

The intervention of the British led to his appointing as governor again, and he became governor of the Vilayet of Syria on 22 November 1878, a post he held until 31 August 1881. During his tenure he endeavoured to reform the province. He used a charitable association for education, which had been formed by some of Beirut's prominent Muslim citizens, into a centrepiece of his educational reform, and encouraged the formation of similar associations in Damascus and elsewhere.

He admitted many Arabs in the civil service, including in the positions of qaimaqam and mutasarrif, and gave minorities broad representation in the administration. He encouraged the development of the press, and the number of newspapers rose to more than twelve. He took an interest in the construction of roads, and in the maintenance of security. He involved local notables in the financing of local projects, such as the tramway system in Tripoli and the founding of the Beirut Chamber of Commerce. He then resigned the post, as he felt Istanbul was offering him an insufficient amount of support. His reputation in Europe was that his reforming zeal was an aberration, based on individual strength of personality. They believed Midhat Pasha could not succeed, citing the inefficient and corrupt nature of the Ottoman state, and the fractured nature of its society.

Imprisonment and death
He served briefly in İzmir as governor of the vilayet of Aydin, but on 17 May 1881, after only a few months on that post, he was arrested. Ahmed Cevdet Pasha, the justice minister, brought him to Istanbul, where he was charged with the murder of Sultan Abdülaziz. The interrogation and court proceedings took place at Yildiz. In conclusion, he was convicted and charged with the murder, and was sentenced to death. However the execution was commuted to life imprisonment in Taif in Hejaz. 

Some historians claim that these to be trumped-up accusations as they believe that confessions were extracted from some suspects through the use of torture, and the use of forged evidence and paid witnesses led to his conviction.   However, they claim that the British pressure impeded his execution, so he was imprisoned in the fortress of Taif, in Hejaz. It was reported that, soon after his arrival, the Emir of Mecca received a message from Istanbul  demanding the death of Midhat from "an accident". The incumbent Emir Abdul Muttalib was a close friend of Midhat however, and no action was taken by him. As a result, Osman Pasha, governor of Hejaz, surrounded the Emir's summer residence in Taif and imprisoned him. After that, Midhat Pasha's fate was sealed. He was assassinated in his cell on 26 April 1883.

Gallery

References

External links

 Death of Midhat Pasha, the Career of the Great Reformer in Turkey from the New York Times (12 May 1884)
 The life of Midhat Pasha (1903 biography)
 Page images at the Internet Archive
 transcribed text at Project Gutenberg
 

Pashas
1822 births
1883 deaths
Civil servants from the Ottoman Empire
Exiles from the Ottoman Empire
19th-century Grand Viziers of the Ottoman Empire
Ottoman governors of Damascus
Executed people from the Ottoman Empire
Assassinated people from the Ottoman Empire
Ottoman governors of Aidin
Politicians from Istanbul
19th-century executions by the Ottoman Empire
Reform in the Ottoman Empire
Ottoman governors of Baghdad
Baghdad vilayet